

Administrative and municipal divisions

 ✪ - part of Komi-Permyak Okrug (Ко́ми-Пермя́цкий о́круг)

References

See also
Administrative divisions of Perm Oblast
Administrative divisions of Komi-Permyak Autonomous Okrug

Perm Krai
Perm Krai